Jaroslav Machovec (born 5 September 1986) is a Slovak football defender who most recently played for Austrian club SC Kittsee.

Career
Machovec spent one season with Nitra, appearing in 5 league matches.
He came to Spartak Trnava in summer 2010.

In July 2019, Machovec joined Austrian club FC Rohrendorf. He left the club again in November 2019. He then joined SC Kittsee in January 2020.

References

External links
 

1986 births
Living people
Slovak footballers
Slovak expatriate footballers
Slovak Super Liga players
Czech First League players
Cypriot Second Division players
Ekstraklasa players
I liga players
FC Nitra players
Ayia Napa FC players
Odra Wodzisław Śląski players
FC Petržalka players
FC Spartak Trnava players
Ahva Arraba F.C. players
SK Dynamo České Budějovice players
FC Baník Ostrava players
Spartak Myjava players
GKS Tychy players
Slovak expatriate sportspeople in the Czech Republic
Slovak expatriate sportspeople in Poland
Slovak expatriate sportspeople in Cyprus
Slovak expatriate sportspeople in Austria
Expatriate footballers in the Czech Republic
Expatriate footballers in Poland
Expatriate footballers in Cyprus
Expatriate footballers in Austria
Association football defenders
Association football midfielders
People from Rakovník
Sportspeople from the Central Bohemian Region